Paraphryneta guttata is a species of beetle in the family Cerambycidae. It was described by Quedenfeldt in 1888, originally under the genus Inesida.

References

Phrynetini
Beetles described in 1888